Omar Rashad Tyree (born April 15, 1969) is an African-American novelist. He is known for his best-selling book For the Love of Money and Mayor for Life: The Incredible Story of Marion Barry, Jr. he co-authored with Marion Barry.

Early life and education 
Tyree, also known as Briggs, was born in 1969 in Philadelphia, Pennsylvania, United States. He graduated from Central High School in 1987; after which he enrolled at the University of Pittsburgh, where he studied to become a pharmacist before transferring to Howard University in 1989.

His journey as an entrepreneur began in his early twenties, when he started a book publishing company, Mar Productions, to release his earliest works of fiction. Recently, Tyree released his first movie, The Lure of Young Women.

In 1991, Tyree received a degree in print journalism from Howard University.

Career
Shortly, after his graduation, he started to work as a reporter and an assistant editor at The Capitol Spotlight. Later, he worked as a chief reporter for News Dimensions.

In 2003, Tyree released a hip-hop album titled Rising Up!

Tyree's first non-fiction book, The Equation: Applying the 4 Indisputable Components of Business Success, was published in January 2009.

Awards and recognition 
 2001: NAACP Image Award for  Outstanding Literature
 2006: Phillis Wheatley Literary Award for Body of Work in Fiction.

Bibliography 

As Omar Tyree:

Capital City (1993)
 Battlezone (1994)
Flyy Girl (1997-11)
A Do Right Man (1998-10)
Single Mom (1999-10)
Sweet St. Louis (2000–08)
For the Love of Money (2001–08)
Just Say No (2002–07)
Leslie (2003–08)
Diary of a Groupie (2004–06)
Dark Thirst (2004–10)
Boss Lady (2005–06)
What They Want (2006–07)
The Last Street Novel (2007-07)
Pecking Order (2008)

Under the pen name the Urban Griot:

College Boy (2003)
Cold Blooded (2004)

References

External links 
 
 African American Literature Book Club

1969 births
Living people
20th-century American novelists
21st-century American novelists
African-American novelists
American male novelists
Howard University alumni
Writers from Philadelphia
20th-century American male writers
21st-century American male writers
Novelists from Pennsylvania
20th-century African-American writers
21st-century African-American writers
African-American male writers